Barry's is a boutique fitness brand offering high-intensity interval workouts consisting of alternating sessions of cardio and strength training. The company was founded in Los Angeles in 1998. Barry’s currently has more than 70 studios spread across 14 countries, with the majority in the United States.

History 

Barry’s was founded in West Hollywood, Los Angeles in 1998 by Barry Jay, along with his partners, John and Rachel Mumford. The company opened its first studio outside of the United States in 2011, when it debuted in Bergen, Norway. That same year, Barry’s opened its first studio in New York, and in 2013 the company opened its first studio in London.

Barry’s CEO Joey Gonzalez began working at the company in 2003, working his way from up from an instructor. He became CEO in 2015.

Private equity firm North Castle Partners announced an investment in July 2015 in which they purchased the majority of the company.

Two years later, in 2017, Barry’s began expanding further, opening studios in the American cities Chicago, Dallas, San Francisco, Boston, Atlanta and Washington, D.C., as well as in international cities Toronto, Calgary, Milan, Stockholm, Sydney, and Dubai. In 2019, the Red Room expanded across more cities around the US including Houston, Charlotte, and Philadelphia.

In February 2020, Barry’s launched Barry’s Ride, a lower impact 50-minute class that uses bikes rather than treadmills. Ride is currently offered in Venice, California and New York’s Chelsea neighborhood.- 70 and 14

Barry’s shortened its name from Barry’s Bootcamp in 2019.

According to Bloomberg, Barry’s could be valued at around $700 million.

Services 

Classes are either 50 or 60 minutes and consist of alternating intervals of running on treadmills and lifting weights on the floor. Barry’s studios feature loud music and red lighting.

Media coverage 
Barry’s was featured in the December 7, 2019 episode of Saturday Night Live. In the sketch, singer and actress Jennifer Lopez auditions to become a Barry’s instructor.

References 

1998 establishments in California
Exercise organizations
Companies based in Los Angeles